Events from the year 1895 in Taiwan.

Incumbents
 Governor of Taiwan Province (Qing dynasty of China): Tang Jingsong
 Governor-General of Taiwan (Japan): Kabayama Sukenori

Events

July
 29 May – The start of Japanese invasion of Taiwan.
 18 June – The establishment of National Taiwan University Hospital.

References

 
Years of the 19th century in Taiwan